Neanthes is a genus of polychaetes belonging to the family Nereididae.

The genus has almost cosmopolitan distribution.

Species 
Species in this genus include:
 Neanthes abyssorum (Hartman, 1967) 
 Neanthes acuminata (Ehlers, 1868) 
 Neanthes arenaceodentata (Moore, 1903)
 Neanthes fucata (Savigny, 1822)
 Neanthes goodayi (Drennan, Wiklund, Rabone, Georgieva, Dahlgren & Glover, 2021)

References

Phyllodocida